KPOW (1260 kHz) is an American AM radio station licensed to serve the community of Powell, Wyoming.  The station is owned by MGR Media LLC, and carries a local program in the morning, syndicated programming during the midday and country music in the evenings and weekends.

The studios and offices are located south of town at 912 Lane 11 1/2. The two tower transmitter site is on Lane 13.

According to FCC Ownership reports, MGR Media is part of Chaparral Broadcasting, which is 100% owned by Jerrold T. Lundquist of Westport, Connecticut.

References

External links
FCC History Cards for KPOW
KPOW official website

POW
Country radio stations in the United States
Radio stations established in 1941
Powell, Wyoming
1941 establishments in Wyoming